Richard Swain (born 2 July 1975) is a New Zealand former professional rugby league footballer who played in the 1990s and 2000s. A New Zealand international , he played club football in Australia for the Hunter Mariners, Melbourne Storm (with whom he won the 1999 NRL premiership) and Brisbane Broncos and in England for Hull F.C.

Early years
Swain was born and raised in Tamworth, New South Wales, Australia, he went to Farrer Memorial Agricultural High School, Tamworth the same school as former Canberra Raiders captain Alan Tongue and Tom Learoyd-Lahrs.

Playing career

Australia
Swain made his first grade début in 1997, playing for the new Hunter Mariners club. With the demise of the club at the end of the year he moved south, joining the Melbourne Storm.

Swain never missed a game for the Melbourne Storm from the club's first ever match in round 1, 1998 up until his final game for the club in round 26, 2002. Swain declared his eligibility for New Zealand in 1999 and was selected for the New Zealand national rugby league team for that year's ANZAC Test.

Swain played at hooker in 1999 NRL Grand Final victory over St. George Illawarra. Swain was selected for the New Zealand team to compete in the end of season 1999 Rugby League Tri-Nations tournament.

Swain went on to play in nineteen tests for New Zealand, including at the 2000 World Cup.

Swain was named the Storm's player of the year in 2001. Swain also the first player in the National Rugby League to top 1,000 Tackles in a season and was also Super League's "Top Tackler" in 2004 with 907 tackles for Hull. He went on the 2002 New Zealand rugby league tour of Great Britain and France and was the goal-kicker and leading point-scorer of the tour. Swain spent 2003 with the Brisbane Broncos before joining Hull F.C. for four years in the Super League.

England
Kevin Sinfield was named Lance Todd Trophy winner 5-minutes from time, when at the time Leeds Rhinos were winning.
Swain retired halfway through the 2007 season due to a back injury.

References

External links
New Zealand profile
SL stats profile

1975 births
Living people
Australian expatriate sportspeople in England
Brisbane Broncos players
Hull F.C. captains
Hull F.C. players
Hunter Mariners players
Melbourne Storm players
New Zealand national rugby league team players
New Zealand rugby league players
People from Tamworth, New South Wales
Rugby league hookers
Rugby league players from New South Wales